Samanu ( / samanu), Samanak ( / samanak), Sümelek ( /  / Syumelek), Sumanak,  Sumalak or Sümölök is a sweet paste made from germinated wheat (young wheatgrass) and wheat flour, which is prepared especially for Nowruz (beginning of spring) in a large pot (like a kazan). This practice has been traced back to the pre-Islamic Sasanian Persian Empire. Although Samanu is prominent for "Haft-Sin" (the seven symbolic items traditionally displayed at Nowruz), the preparation "mela" (referring to a picnic) and eating it is traditional in Afghanistan.

The wheat is soaked and prepared for days and so the entire process takes up to a week. Traditionally, the final cooking would take from evening until the daylight and was a party involving only women. This would be full of laughter and music and singing related songs. In Afghanistan and Uzbekistan the whole gathering, mostly women, gather near the huge pot. They sit in a circle, sing songs, and have fun, each of them waiting for their turn to stir the sumalak. While stirring the samanak, wishes can be made. Also, whole walnuts are thrown in near the end of the preparation while making a wish. In the morning still warm sumalak is handed out to neighbors, relatives and friends. In Tajikistan and Afghanistan they sing: Samanak dar Jūsh u mā Kafcha zanēm – Dīgarān dar Khwāb u mā Dafcha zanēm. (meaning: "Samanak is boiling and we are stirring it, others are asleep and we are playing daf").

In modern times, making Samanu can be a family activity. Traditional Samanu is made entirely of germinated wheat and water (no other ingredients). Nowadays, it is common to add a bit of flour to speed up the thickening process, although this makes the paste taste somewhat bitter and less sweet.

A plate or bowl of Samanu is a traditional component of the Haft-sin table.

Samanu trade 

In Iran, cooking and selling Samanu in the last days of the year has become a kind of seasonal trade, referred to the city of Ashtian, which is produced, sold and exported to European, Arab and East Asian countries. It has become Samanu business and has been called the Samanu city of Iran.

Recipe 
To prepare Samanu, you need one kilogram of whole wheat flour for every kilogram of wheat.

1. Wash the wheat. Soak them in water overnight. Then pour into a tray and wipe with a cotton cloth. The fabric should always be wet. Let them germinate for 2 to 3 days and grind them before they turn green.

2- Pour them into a strainer, pour a little water on them, and touch them to separate the wheat juice from the wheat bran.

3- Mix wheat juice with flour. The flour should be completely dissolved in the juice and water and not pelleted. For 10 kg of flour and 1 kg of wheat, about 8 to 10 liters of water is needed.

4- Put the Samanu material on the gas flame, increase the heat and stir the material constantly not to settle until it boils.

5. When the Samanu boils, it no longer needs to be stirred constantly. Stir it only every hour and reduce the flame temperature very low. Samanu is prepared in 10 to 15 hours; And you can decorate it with pistachios or almonds.

See also
Ashure, a Turkish wheat berry pudding
Mämmi, a Finnish dessert made from water and partly malted rye, preparation taking several days to be ready for the spring festival Easter

References

Azerbaijani cuisine
Iranian desserts
Afghan cuisine
Tajik cuisine
Wheat dishes
New Year foods
Central Asian desserts
Halva
Uzbek dishes